Leopard Moth may refer to:

Giant leopard moth, or Hypercompe scribonia
Zeuzera pyrina, a member of the family Cossoidea
De Havilland Leopard Moth, a 1933 three seat de Havilland plane

Animal common name disambiguation pages